John Francis Cornely (born May 17, 1989) is an American former professional baseball pitcher. He has played in Major League Baseball (MLB) for the Atlanta Braves.

Career

Atlanta Braves
Cornely was drafted by the Atlanta Braves in the 15th round of the 2011 Major League Baseball Draft out of Wofford College.

Cornely was called up to the majors for the first time on April 24, 2015. He was designated for assignment on May 19.

Boston Red Sox
Cornely was traded to the Boston Red Sox on May 20, 2015. He was released by the Red Sox on March 28, 2016. Cornely retired in 2016.

References

External links

Wofford Terriers bio

1989 births
Living people
People from Mount Pleasant, South Carolina
Baseball players from South Carolina
Major League Baseball pitchers
Atlanta Braves players
Wofford Terriers baseball players
Danville Braves players
Rome Braves players
Lynchburg Hillcats players
Scottsdale Scorpions players
Mississippi Braves players
Pawtucket Red Sox players